Benningholme is a hamlet in the East Riding of Yorkshire, England, in an area known as Holderness. It forms part of the civil parish of Swine.

Benningholme is listed in the Domesday Book as "Benicol" and "Benincol". It was within the Holderness Middle Hundred of the East Riding of Yorkshire. At the Norman Conquest Ulf Fenman was the lord, this transferred in 1086 to Drogo de la Beuvriere, who also became Tenant-in-chief.

Benningholme is the site of a deserted medieval village (DMV),  near Benningholme Grange (farm), and Benningholme Hall. In 1571 an enclosure was noted. The deserted settlement is defined by now hardly discernible earthworks.

In 1899 Benningholme, as part of the township of Benningholme-with-Grange, was within the parish of Skirlaugh. Benningholme township land was owned by The Crown, which was also the lord of the manor. Benningholme's population in 1891 was 88. Post was directed through Hull, being collected from and distributed to Skirlaugh by foot messenger. Skirlaugh contained the nearest money order and telegraph office.

A half-mile (800 metres) to the east of Benningholme is the Grade II listed Benningholme Hall, an 1820–30 late Georgian house. Built of grey gault brick, it is of a five-bay and two-storey construction with a hipped roof of Welsh slate. The central entrance is surrounded by a portico with an entablature supported by columns of ionic style. At the rear of the building is an iron veranda along its length, with a bow structure part enclosing a garden below. Attached to the original house is a 20th-century extension.

References

External links

"Skirlaugh", Genuki; includes Benningholme and Grange. Retrieved 3 February 2014.

Villages in the East Riding of Yorkshire
Holderness